This is a list of members of the Victorian Legislative Assembly, from the elections of 30 December 1865, 15 and 29 January 1866 to the elections of 21 January; 7, 20 February 1868. Victoria was a British self-governing colony in Australia at the time.

 
Note the "Term in Office" refers to that members term(s) in the Assembly, not necessarily for that electorate.

 McCann forfeited his seat in August 1867 after being imprisoned for forgery, replaced by William Stutt in September 1867.
 Wardrop resigned c. September 1866, replaced by Ambrose Kyte in a September by-election.
Francis Murphy was Speaker.

References

Members of the Parliament of Victoria by term
19th-century Australian politicians